Agastya is a 2016 Indian Odia action thriller film directed by K. M Krishna and produced under Akshya Parija Productions. It was released on 12 June 2016 at Rajo Festival. It was one of the best Odia movies in 2016. Anubhav Mohanty, Akash, and Jhillik play lead roles. It is a remake of the 2014 Kannada action movie Ugramm. The music was released by Amara Muzik. 
It was a Superhit movie in the Odia film industry.

Cast 
 Anubhav Mohanty as Agastya
 Akash Das Nayak
 Jhilik Bhattacharya
 Mihir Das
 Minaketan Das
 Manoj Mishra
 Aswin Tripathy
 Agastya Asthana
 Kalicharan
 Pragnya Khatua
 Shankar 
 Kumar
 Priyanka(Agastya Mother)

Soundtrack

The complete soundtrack album was released on 27 September 2017.

Satellite rights 
Sarthak TV purchased the film's satellite rights for 40 Lakhs, which was a record amount for an Ollywood film.

References

External links
 
Ollywood: New Odia Action Movie *AGASTYA* of Anubhab Mohanty

2016 action thriller films
Indian action thriller films
Odia remakes of Kannada films
2010s Odia-language films